is a Japanese former professional road and track cyclist. He won the gold medal in the scratch race at the 2016 Asian Cycling Championships.

Major results

2013
 3rd Time trial, National Under-23 Road Championships
2014
 2nd Time trial, National Under-23 Road Championships
2015
 Asian Track Championships
1st Points race
2nd Team pursuit
2016
 1st Scratch, Asian Track Championships

References

External links
 
 

1992 births
Living people
Japanese track cyclists
Japanese male cyclists
Place of birth missing (living people)